Daniel Ciampini (born November 25, 1990) is a Canadian professional ice hockey winger currently playing with the Sheffield Steelers of the UK's Elite Ice Hockey League (EIHL).

Playing career

Ciampini played college hockey at Union from 2011–15; he was part of the 2013–14 national championship team. In 2014–15, Ciampini was a finalist for the Hobey Baker Award, marking him as one of the ten best players in men's college hockey; he was also named All-ECAC First Team. On March 18, 2015, Ciampini signed an amateur try-out agreement with the Worcester Sharks of the AHL. On March 23, 2015, Ciampini signed an AHL contract with Worcester.

On July 8, 2015, Ciampini secured an AHL contract as a free agent, agreeing to a one-year deal with the Rockford IceHogs. In the 2015–16 season, contributed with 1 goal in 10 games with the IceHogs. He was reassigned for the majority of the campaign with ECHL affiliate, Indy Fuel, in producing 38 points in 48 games.

As a free agent in the off-season, Ciampini secured another AHL deal, signing a one-year contract with the Ontario Reign on August 4, 2016. In the 2016–17 season, Ciampini split the year between the Reign and ECHL affiliate, the Manchester Monarchs.

On September 15, 2017, having left the Reign as a free agent, Ciampini agreed to a one-year deal with inaugural AHL club, the Belleville Senators.

After two seasons within the Belleville Senators organization, Ciampini decided to pursue a European career, agreeing to a one-year contract with Norwegian club, Stjernen Hockey of the GET-ligaen on June 14, 2019. 

Following a season stint in Austria with HC TWK Innsbruck of the ICE Hockey League, Ciampini continued his European career by agreeing to a one-year contract with Czech club, Rytíři Kladno of the ELH, on July 14, 2021.

After a spell in Italy with HC Bozen-Bolzano, Ciampini signed terms ahead of the 2022–23 season with UK EIHL side Sheffield Steelers.

Career statistics

Awards and honors

References

External links
 

1990 births
Living people
Belleville Senators players
Bolzano HC players
Brampton Beast players
Canadian ice hockey forwards
Ice hockey people from Ontario
Indy Fuel players
HC TWK Innsbruck players
Manchester Monarchs (ECHL) players
Ontario Reign (AHL) players
Rockford IceHogs (AHL) players
Rytíři Kladno players
Sheffield Steelers players
St. Michael's Buzzers players
Stjernen Hockey players
Union Dutchmen ice hockey players
Worcester Sharks players
AHCA Division I men's ice hockey All-Americans
Canadian expatriate ice hockey players in the United States
Canadian expatriate ice hockey players in the Czech Republic
Canadian expatriate ice hockey players in Italy
Canadian expatriate ice hockey players in Austria
Canadian expatriate ice hockey players in Norway
Canadian expatriate ice hockey players in England